Wilmot Abraham Perera (1905–1973) was a Sri Lankan statesman and philanthropist. He was declared a National Hero in 1993. A member of parliament, he was Ceylon's first Ambassador to China.

Early life and education
Born in Panadura to M. Abraham Perera, a wealthy landowner, widely known as the "Rubber King". His maternal grandparents were Jeramias Dias and Celestina Dias, who founded Visakha Vidyalaya. Perera was educated initially at St. John's College Panadura and later at the Royal College, Colombo.

Social service and philanthropy
He became a Planter, taking over the management of his family plantations. He became active in his home area, establishing the first rural development society in Raigam Korale. He went on to establish Sri Palee College in Horana, based on the Rabindranath Tagore's Shantiniketan in 1934. The foundation stone was laid by Tagore on 20 May 1934 on his last visit to Ceylon. The Sri Palee Trust was established by him to manage the lands gifted by him. After his death, part of this property comprising many buildings was donated to the University of Ceylon by his family, in his memory in 1976. This later became the Sri Palee Campus of the University of Colombo. After his death, his ancestral home in Panadura was handed over to the Sri Sumangala Girls' School.

Political career
The Suriya-Mal Movement was inaugurated at his residence in 1933. In 1935 he became a founding member of the Lanka Sama Samaja Party, becoming active politics and the Sri Lankan independence movement. He contested the 1947 general election from the Matugama electorate as an Independent Socialist, defeating the "father of free education" C.W.W. Kannangara and was elected to the first Parliament of Ceylon. He was re-elected in the 1952 general election from the Viplavakari Lanka Sama Samaja Party, defeating D. D. Athulathmudali. He was a member of the Viplavakari Lanka Sama Samaja Party for a short while.

He was appointed as the first Ceylonese Ambassador to China in 1957 when Ceylon established diplomatic ties with the People's Republic of China and served till 1960, when he was succeeded by William Gopallawa. In 1961 he was appointed to head the first Salaries and Cadres Commission (known thereafter as the Wilmot A. Perera Commission). He also served as the Chairman of the Commission for Higher Education.

Family
He was married to Esme Perera Abeywardena, a grand daughter of the late Sir Charles Henry de Soysa, Sri Lanka's foremost Philanthropist. They had two children, a daughter Enoka and son Ajit.

Gallery

See also
Sri Palee Campus
Sri Palee College
Sri Lankan Non Career Diplomats

References

External links
Problems of Rural Ceylon (1932)
Perera, Wilmot A. (1905–73)
Sri Lanka China trade relationship
THE LANKA SAMASAMAJA PARTY (LSSP) 1935 ? 2007
Wilmot A. Perera
Visionary educationist

Alumni of Royal College, Colombo
Ambassadors of Sri Lanka to China
Members of the 1st Parliament of Ceylon
Members of the 2nd Parliament of Ceylon
Lanka Sama Samaja Party politicians
National Heroes of Sri Lanka
1905 births
1973 deaths
Sinhalese politicians
Sri Lankan planters
People from Panadura